The Country Beyond is a 1936 American drama film directed by Eugene Forde and written by Adele Comandini and Lamar Trotti. The film stars Rochelle Hudson, Paul Kelly, Robert Kent, Alan Hale, Sr., Alan Dinehart and Andrew Tombes. The film was released on April 24, 1936, by 20th Century Fox.

Plot

Cast  
Rochelle Hudson as Jean Alison
Paul Kelly as Sgt. Cassidy
Robert Kent as Cpl. Robert King
Alan Hale, Sr. as Jim Alison
Alan Dinehart as Ray Jennings
Andrew Tombes as Sen. Rawlings
Claudia Coleman as Mrs. Rawlings
Matt McHugh as Const. Weller
Paul McVey as Fred Donaldson
Holmes Herbert as Insp. Reed

References

External links 
 

1936 films
1930s English-language films
American drama films
1936 drama films
20th Century Fox films
Films directed by Eugene Forde
American black-and-white films
Films with screenplays by Lamar Trotti
Royal Canadian Mounted Police in fiction
Northern (genre) films
Films based on novels by James Oliver Curwood
1930s American films